The Friniates were an ancient Eastern Ligurian people who lived in Cisalpine Gaul (Northern Italy), in the Apennines area between the current provinces of Reggio Emilia and Modena. With the Roman conquest of Cisalpine Gaul, they were reduced to subjection by Gaius Flaminius in 187 BCE.

References

Sources

Ligures
Tribes conquered by the Roman Republic
Tribes conquered by Rome